"I Know You Want Me" is a 1998 song by Nastyboy Klick a.k.a. NBK (later active as NB Ridaz), and CeCe Peniston. To the record also contributed bassist Ray Riendeau, most known for his work with singer Rob Halford (from heavy metal band Judas Priest).

The single was released on the various artists' compilation called M.C. Magic Presents Desert Funk Soundtrack, which was produced by Phoenix-based artist Marcus Cardenas on his own Nastyboy Records, and featured an additional track performed by Peniston (the Latino hip-hop ballad "When I'm with You").

On April 18, "I Know You Want Me" peaked at number nine in the U.S. Billboard Bubbling Under Hot 100 R&B Singles as the lead single of the NBK's second full-length album Tha Second Coming, released later on in 1998 on Upstairs Records.

Credits and personnel
 Nastyboy Klick - lead vocals
 CeCe Peniston - back vocal
 Marcus Cardenas (alias M.C. Magic) - writer, producer, mix
 Daniel Salas - writer
 Ricardo Martinez - writer
 Dave Knauer - additional producer, mix
 Ray Riendeau - bass
 John Lopez - executive producer
 Magics Studio - recording studio
 Anthem Studio - mix

Charts

Weekly charts

References

General

 Specific

External links 
 
 

1998 singles
CeCe Peniston songs
1998 songs